The Yamaha XV1900A is a motorcycle manufactured by the Yamaha Motor Company and sold in the United States through Yamaha's Star Motorcycles division. It was the largest Yamaha motorcycle while in production.

Development
The Yamaha XV1900A cruiser was developed to exploit the large displacement end of the market for large cruisers. Yamaha had a well established range of big "Star" cruisers which went up to the Wild Star 1600 cc but there was a need to redesign the engine to meet anticipated exhaust emissions regulations and the opportunity to update the styling, which had remained largely unchanged for a decade.

Engine

The   four-stroke, air-cooled, 48 degree V-twin engine was purpose-built to deliver maximum torque at 2,500 rpm in the  range used for motorcycle cruising. Each cylinder has four pushrod-activated valves and twin spark plugs. To reduce friction, the forged pistons have an Alumite coating and travel in ceramic-composite-coated cylinder bores.

With an undersquare bore and stroke of 100mm (3.937 in) x 118mm (4.646 in), the engine has a compression ratio of 9.5:1 and is the first Yamaha cruiser motorcycle to be equipped with the compact Exhaust Ultimate Power Valve (EXUP) four-stroke power valve system previously only found on their line of high performance sports motorcycles.

An unusual feature of the new engine is a special 'Pent-roof combustion chamber', designed to increase the efficiency of gas flow.  The engine also has counter-rotating balancers on both ends of the crankshaft to reduce the vibration typical of large V-Twins.

Transmission
The engine’s output is transmitted via a wide-ratio five-speed gearbox and compact new transfer case, with power delivery controlled by a hydraulic clutch, the XV1900A Midnight Star is equipped with a belt drive system.

Frame
A lightweight long wheelbase frame was designed using aluminum die casting to minimize weight, with a double cradle design to provide the strength. Suspension consists of a die cast aluminum swinging arm and a hidden single horizontal rear shock absorber and large diameter front forks.

Raider version
Starting in 2008, a custom version was produced in limited numbers featuring a lowered seat, lengthened front forks, a wider 210 mm rear tyre, the widest on any Yamaha motorcycle, 
and special black finish to the engine and a range of custom fittings.  The Raider was discontinued for 2018.

See also 
Yamaha DragStar

References

External links

 Official Yamaha XV1900A web site
 

Cruiser motorcycles
XV1900A
Motorcycles introduced in 2006